This list gives details of all the performances of Richard Wagner's opera cycle Der Ring Des Nibelungen produced at the Bayreuth Festival, from the festival's inception in 1876, down to 2017. For differing reasons, no festivals were held between 1877 and 1881, 1915 to 1923, and 1943 to 1950. There were a few other years when the festival was "rested", and some in which it was dedicated to other Wagner operas.

Since the revival of the festival after the Second World War, a general principle has developed in which new productions are introduced to the festival at regular intervals, each such production being staged for five years followed by a "rest" year.

Table
 
Total number of Ring cycles performed at Bayreuth, 1876 to 2017: 222

Notes and references

Notes

Citations

Sources

Bayreuth Ring
Ring
Bayreuth Ring